Maryan Hary (born 27 May 1980 in Le Mans) is a French professional road bicycle racer.

Major results

 Tour de l'Ain - 1 stage (2003)
 Paris–Tours U23 (2002)

External links 
Profile at Cofidis official website 

French male cyclists
1980 births
Living people
Sportspeople from Le Mans
Cyclists from Pays de la Loire